Carina Aaltonen (born 19 January 1964) is an Åland politician, representing the Social Democrats. She has served for two terms on the municipal council of Jomala (2002–03 and 2004–11), becoming deputy chair in 2008. From 2011 to 2015, she was Minister of Social Affairs and Environment in Åland's Regional Government.

Aaltonen has also served on the Nordic Council, for the Council of Ministers for Fisheries, Aquaculture, Agriculture, Food and Forestry in 2012, and as the Åland representative for Social Affairs and Environment, from November 2011 to November 2015.

Outside her political life, she has also been involved in the Emmaus Movement for which she was elected chair of Emmaus Finland in January 2015. In February 2016, she was elected President of Emmaus Finland.

References

1964 births
Living people
Politicians from Åland
Women from Åland in politics
People from Jomala